Elections to Welwyn Hatfield Borough Council took place on 3 May 2018. This was on the same day as other local elections across the United Kingdom.

Composition of the Council

Prior to the election the composition of the council was:

After the election, the composition of the council was:

Results summary

Ward results

Brookmans Park and Little Heath

Haldens

Handside

Hatfield Central

Hatfield East

Hatfield South West

Hatfield Villages

Hollybush

Howlands

Northaw and Cuffley

Panshanger

Peartree

Sherrards

Welham Green and Hatfield South

Welwyn East

Welwyn West

By-Elections

Welwyn West

A by-election was held on 29 November following the death of Mandy Perkins, the leader of the Council.

References

2018
2018 English local elections